Durio grandiflorus, commonly known as durian munjit, is endemic to the island of Borneo.

It is a medium-sized tree up to 30 m tall.

It is one of the edible species in the genus Durio, which produces the popular fruit known as durian. The fruit of this species has yellow flesh.

References

grandiflorus
Endemic flora of Borneo
Trees of Borneo
Fruits originating in Asia
Vulnerable flora of Asia